Minaxolone (CCI-12923) is a neuroactive steroid which was developed as a general anesthetic but was withdrawn before registration due to toxicity seen with long-term administration in rats, and hence was never marketed. It is a positive allosteric modulator of the GABAA receptor, as well as, less potently, a positive allosteric modulator of the glycine receptor.

Chemistry

See also
 Alfadolone
 Alfaxolone
 Ganaxolone
 Hydroxydione
 Pregnanolone
 Renanolone

References

General anesthetics
Neurosteroids
Secondary alcohols
Ethers
Dimethylamino compounds
Ketones
GABAA receptor positive allosteric modulators
Glycine receptor agonists
Pregnanes